Hervé Lacombe is a French musicologist, a professor at the University Rennes 2 since 2002 and a specialist of music of France. He is the author of several works on the opera and two biographies, one of Georges Bizet and the other of Francis Poulenc.

Biography 
Hervé Lacombe studied at the université Lyon II, and the Conservatoire national supérieur de musique et de danse de Paris, before passing his aggregation of music and to support a doctoral thesis and a university degree in musicology.

He received a scholarship from the École française de Rome and a delegation to the Centre national de la recherche scientifique. Initially a lecturer at the University of Metz, he has been a professor at the université Rennes 2 since 2002.

Hervé Lacombe is a member of the editorial board of the monumental edition L’Opéra français, Bärenreiter-Verlag, and of the International Advisory Panel of the Journal of the Royal Musical Association.

Publications 
1997: Les Voies de l'opéra français au XIXe siècle, Fayard, 392 p., prix Bernier of the Académie des beaux-arts 1997,  (prix spécial du jury) 1998 and prix Eugène Carrière of the Académie française 1998
2001: The Keys to French Opera in the Nineteenth Century, revised and augmented version of Les Voies de l'opéra français au XIXe siècle, trad. Edward Schneider, Berkeley, University of California Press, 442 p.
2000: Georges Bizet : Naissance d'une identité créatrice, Fayard, 860 p., prix Bordin de l'Académie des beaux-arts 2001
2007: Géographie de l'opéra au XXe siècle, Fayard, 317 p.
2011: Opéra et fantastique (direction with Timothée Picard), Presses Universitaires de Rennes, 428 p. .
2013: Francis Poulenc, grand prix des Muses- 2014 and prix Pelléas 2014
2014: La Habanera de Carmen, with Christine Rodriguez, Fayard, 224 p.

References

External links 
 Hervé Lacombe on Éditions Fayard
 Hervé Lacombe on the site of the Académie française
 Biographie et bibliographie d'Hervé Lacombe sur le site de l'université Rennes 2
 Hervé Lacombe on Symétrie

Living people
20th-century French musicologists
21st-century French musicologists
French biographers
Academic staff of Rennes 2 University
Year of birth missing (living people)